Marcelo Fernández (born 13 February 1967) is an Argentine rower. He competed in the men's quadruple sculls event at the 1988 Summer Olympics.

References

1967 births
Living people
Argentine male rowers
Olympic rowers of Argentina
Rowers at the 1988 Summer Olympics
Place of birth missing (living people)